Norşuntepe is a tell, or archaeological settlement mound, in Elazığ Province (Turkey). The site was occupied between the Chalcolithic and Iron Age and is now partially submerged by Lake Keban. It was excavated between 1968 and 1974.

History of research 
It was excavated between 1968 and 1974 under the direction of German archaeologist Harald Hauptmann as part of the salvage project to document archaeological sites that would be flooded by the construction of the Keban Dam. Excavation of the site focused on three areas: the western slope, the so-called "acropolis" area, and the south terrace.

The site and its environment 
Before it was flooded, Norşuntepe was located on the Altınova Plain along a tributary of the Murat River.It is now partially submerged by the reservoir created by the Keban Dam; its top is still above the water level.

Occupation history 
Norşuntepe was occupied from the Chalcolithic to the Iron Age. The excavators have recognized 40 different occupation levels ranging in date from the fifth millennium BC to ca. 600 BC. Its occupation levels overlap to a large degree with those excavated at nearby Arslantepe.

The Chalcolithic occupation at Norşuntepe can be divided in 3 phases. The oldest Phase I dates to the Middle Chalcolithic and included Ubaid-type pottery. Phase II represents the Late Chalcolithic and during its final levels, more complex architecture appeared in the excavated area. Copper production was practiced during this period. The final Chalcolithic phases were characterized by small-scale single-room houses. Radiocarbon dating from the different Chalcolithic levels provided dates between 4300-3800 BC.

After a hiatus, Norşuntepe was again occupied during the Early Bronze Age. During this period, the site was surrounded by a mudbrick city wall built on a stone foundation. There is evidence for copper production and some sort of palace or large, central building appears at the site in the final phases. In terms of material culture and architecture, there are clear parallels with Transcaucasia. The latest Early Bronze Age phase in Norşuntepe ends in fire. The Middle bronze age settlement is smaller than its precursor and no evidence for a palace has been found. The Late Bronze Age remains at Norşuntepe was heavily disturbed by later Iron Age activity, but some larger buildings have been excavated.

The Early Iron Age at Norşuntepe (1150-800 BC) is characterized by a shift away from Hittite material culture, possibly as a result of the influx of immigrants such as the Mushki. The settlement seems to have been restricted to the south terrace and may have had a rural character. During its final occupation phases (800-600 BC), Norşuntepe was part of Urartu. A building with a large, columned hall was located on the mail hill, whereas a second large building, possibly a caravanserai, was excavated on the south terrace. A cemetery located on the hill top included a burial chamber where three horses together with gear and weapons were buried.

The hilltop was again used as a cemetery during the Medieval Period.

References 

Archaeological sites in Eastern Anatolia
Geography of Elazığ Province
Chalcolithic sites of Asia
Bronze Age sites in Asia
Iron Age sites in Asia
Urartian cities
Tells (archaeology)